Abubakar Adamu Rasheed, MFR is a Nigerian academician, administrator, Professor of English and the 9th vice-chancellor of Bayero University, Kano

Education
Rasheed obtained  his bachelor's degree in Art from Bayero University Kano, Masters in Art from the University of Nottingham and PhD from Ahmadu Bello University, Zaria.

Career 
Rasheed became the vice chancellor of Bayero University in 2010, a position he held till 2015. In 2016, Rasheed was appointed executive secretary of National Universities Commission.

References

Living people
1959 births
Ahmadu Bello University alumni
Vice-Chancellors of Nigerian universities
Recipients of the Order of the Federal Republic
Academic staff of Bayero University Kano
Alumni of the University of Nottingham
Bayero University Kano alumni
Nigerian academic administrators
Members of the Order of the Federal Republic